The men's 100 metre butterfly S10 event at the 2022 Commonwealth Games was held on 2 August at the Sandwell Aquatics Centre.

Schedule
The schedule is as follows:

All times are British Summer Time (UTC+1)

Results

Final

References

Men's 100 metre butterfly S10